Oceania is the second studio album by Australian folk-rock band Goanna, released in April 1985. The album peaked at number 29 on the Australian Kent Music Report.

Track listing

Goanna
 Roslyn Bygrave – synthesiser, keyboards, backing vocals
 Peter Coughlan – bass guitar
 Marcia Howard – backing vocals, synthesiser, lead vocals (track 4)
 Shane Howard – guitar, synthesiser, lead vocals (except track 4)
 Robert Ross – percussion, drums

Additional musicians
Joe Creighton – bass guitar (tracks 4, 9)
Venetta Fields – backing vocals (tracks 4, 9)
Ross Hannaford – electric guitar (track 4, 5, 8, 9)
Mal Logan – synth solo (track 8)
Ian Morrison – backing vocals (tracks 2, 5)
Alex Pertout – percussion
Bill Payne – keyboards
David Platchon – drums (track 6)
Eddie Rayner – keyboards (track 3)
Greg "Kenny" Sheehan – drums (tracks 5, 7, 10)
Sam See – electric and slide guitar (tracks 3, 4, 6, 7, 10)
Leland Sklar – bass guitar (track 6)

Charts

References

1985 albums
Goanna albums